Maria Bobu (1925–2007) was a Romanian politician (Communist).

She served as Minister of Justice in 1987.

References

1925 births
2007 deaths
20th-century Romanian women politicians
20th-century Romanian politicians
Romanian communists
Women government ministers of Romania